Udea nebulalis is a species of moth in the family Crambidae. It is found in France, Switzerland, Austria, Italy, Germany, Poland, the Czech Republic, Slovakia, Slovenia, Croatia, Bosnia and Herzegovina, Serbia and Montenegro, Bulgaria, Romania, Estonia and Fennoscandia.

The wingspan is 18–25 mm.

The larvae feed on Campanula species.

References

Moths described in 1796
nebulalis
Moths of Europe